Sir William Hepburn McAlpine, 6th Baronet,  (12 January 1936 – 4 March 2018) was a British businessman who was director of the construction company Sir Robert McAlpine.

Early life and career
Born in London in 1936 at the family-owned Dorchester Hotel, McAlpine was the oldest son of Sir Edwin McAlpine, 5th Bt (who was given a life peerage as Lord McAlpine of Moffat in 1980) by his marriage to Ella Mary Gardner Garnett. His great-grandfather was "Concrete Bob", Sir Robert McAlpine, the first of the McAlpine baronets and the founder of the construction company. He had two younger brothers Alistair McAlpine, Baron McAlpine of West Green and David McAlpine.

Brought up at the family home in Surrey and educated at Charterhouse, McAlpine joined the family firm from school, starting his career at the Hayes Depot in Middlesex, a  site which housed the McAlpine railway locomotive and wagon fleet. The years after the Second World War were a busy time for the construction industry.

He served in the Life Guards for two years from 1954.

In 1973, McAlpine purchased the historic British LNER Class A3 4472 Flying Scotsman steam locomotive, saving it from possible demise and repatriating it from the United States two years after a U.S. tour which had bankrupted its previous owner, Alan Pegler. Sir William maintained and ran the locomotive as a service to the British public and international steam community until the mid-1990s, when it was purchased by steam enthusiast Tony Marchington.

In 1990, on the death of his father, McAlpine inherited his baronetcy and became Sir William. He was patron of the Clan MacAlpine Society. He served as High Sheriff of Buckinghamshire for 1999. He was a director and trustee of the educational charity Shiplake Court Limited.

In 2007 McAlpine was president of the Smeatonian Society of Civil Engineers to which he had been elected a member in 1985.

He was also the president of the Railway Benevolent Institution, known as the Railway Benefit Fund, a charity helping current and retired railway industry workers.

Fawley Hill Railway

An acknowledged railway enthusiast, McAlpine returned to Hayes depot during the Beeching Axe to find that the company's Hudswell Clarke 0-6-0ST No.31 was for sale for £100. He purchased the locomotive, and moved it to his country estate home at Fawley, Buckinghamshire. This marked the start in 1961 of the  Fawley Hill Railway, a private railway which now runs to over a mile long, combining the steepest gradient at 1:13 on a British railway, and includes:
The Great Eastern Railway Somersham railway station
Midland Railway signal box from Shobnall Maltings, near Burton upon Trent
The footbridge from Brading on the Isle of Wight, Bridge No 25, where it spanned the Ryde Pier to Shanklin line

In addition, the perimeter of the railway line is adorned with several prominent architectural features which McAlpine acquired – although these were received mostly as donations;  these include the original Wembley Stadium Twin Towers flagpoles, some early cast-iron bridge parapets, and several arched structures from prominent London locations.

Entrance to Fawley Hill Railway is by invitation only on select days, usually during the summer period. McAlpine's extensive private railway museum is maintained by volunteers.

Other railways

After starting Fawley Hill Railway, McAlpine purchased 4079 Pendennis Castle in partnership with John Gretton, which was subsequently housed at Market Overton in Rutland. After being moved to Steamtown, it was sold to Rio Tinto and moved to Australia. In January 1973 McAlpine purchased 4472 Flying Scotsman after a financially disastrous tour of North America, to save it from sale to an American consortium.

McAlpine became involved in a plan to save the Romney, Hythe & Dymchurch Railway (RH&DR) and became its chairman. After the efforts of Dr Peter Beet to preserve Carnforth LMS 10(A) shed, McAlpine bought shares in 1970, and then took the controlling interest from 1974 until 1987 in the visitor attraction that became Steamtown. McAlpine chaired the RH&DR, the Dart Valley Railway, and established and chaired the Railway Heritage Trust.

McAlpine was also a Patron of the Swanage Railway Trust, as well as President of the Transport Trust, the charity dedicated to the preservation of all modes of transport and its infrastructure.

Three locomotives have been named Sir William McAlpine; Ruston 48 No.294266, once owned by Sir William himself, EWS' 60008 and DB Cargo UK's 90028.

Personal life
McAlpine's first wife Jill Benton Jones, whom he married on 31 October 1959, died on 9 February 2004.  
They had two children:

 Sir Andrew William McAlpine, 7th Baronet (born 22 November 1960)
 Lucinda Mary Jane McAlpine (born 19 June 1964)

He married his second wife, Judith, whom he had known for many years, on 25 March 2004 at the restored station on his private railway.

He died after months of illness on 4 March 2018 and was succeeded in the baronetcy by his son.

References

External links
 Profile in The Times
 in The Henley Standard
 Fawley Hill official website

1936 births
2018 deaths
People educated at Charterhouse School
British businesspeople
Businesspeople from London
Baronets in the Baronetage of the United Kingdom
Presidents of the Smeatonian Society of Civil Engineers
Fellows of the Zoological Society of London
British people associated with Heritage Railways
High Sheriffs of Buckinghamshire
Sons of life peers
William